Some Product: Carri on Sex Pistols is an interview album featuring members of the Sex Pistols. The interviews are mostly presented in a collage style.

Content 

All tracks are spoken word collages put together by John Varnom from various interviews and radio ads. Additional material includes a snippet from Tubular Bells. 
    
The artwork was done by artist Jamie Reid.
  
The title melds the British comedy series of Carry On films with a pun on the word carrion.

Release 

The album peaked at number 6 in the UK Albums Chart.

Track listing

"The Very Name 'Sex Pistols'" (various artists)  – 5:27   
"From Beyond the Grave" (Sid Vicious)  – 8:27   
"Big Tits Across America" (Paul Cook and Steve Jones from US radio broadcast)  – 11:19   
"The Complex World of John Rotten" (Johnny Rotten, features interview snippets with John Lydon's Mother)  – 8:18   
"Sex Pistols Will Play" (Paul Cook and Steve Jones)  – 3:21   
"Is the Queen a Moron?" (Sex Pistols interview regarding 'God Save the Queen' lyrics)  – 3:55   
"The Fucking Rotter"  (Sex Pistols)  – 0:41 (This is an edited version of the infamous Bill Grundy interview.)

References 

Sex Pistols live albums
Virgin Records live albums
Interview albums
1979 live albums
Sound collage albums
Warner Records live albums